In mathematics, addition and subtraction logarithms or Gaussian logarithms can be utilized to find the logarithms of the sum and difference of a pair of values whose logarithms are known, without knowing the values themselves.

Their mathematical foundations trace back to Zecchini Leonelli and Carl Friedrich Gauss in the early 1800s.

The operations of addition and subtraction can be calculated by the formula:

For natural logarithms with  the following identities with hyperbolic functions exist:

This shows that  has a Taylor expansion where all but the first term are rational and all odd terms except the linear one are zero.

The simplification of multiplication, division, roots, and powers is counterbalanced by the cost of evaluating these functions for addition and subtraction.

See also 
 Softplus operation in neural networks
 Zech's logarithm
 Logarithm table
 Logarithmic number system (LNS)

References

Further reading
  (NB. Contains a table of Gaussian logarithms lg(1+10−x).)
  
 
 

Logarithms